The 1990 All-Ireland Senior Hurling Championship was the 104th staging of the All-Ireland Senior Hurling Championship, the Gaelic Athletic Association's premier inter-county hurling tournament. The draw for the 1990 provincial fixtures took place in November 1989. The championship began on 13 May 1990 and ended on 2 September 1990.

Tipperary were the defending champions but were defeated by Cork in the Munster final. London qualified for the championship for the first time in two years.

On 2 September 1990, Cork won the championship following a 5–15 to 2–21 defeat of Galway in the All-Ireland final. This was their 27th All-Ireland title, their first in four championship seasons.

Cork's John Fitzgibbon was the championship's top scorer with 7-09. Cork's Tony O'Sullivan was the unanimous choice for Hurler of the Year.

Championship draw

As a result of the Republic of Ireland football team qualifying for the 1990 FIFA World Cup, the Munster Council took precautions in avoiding a fixtures clash and a potential loss of revenue by changing the dates and times of their games.

Teams

Overview

A total of fifteen teams contested the championship, two fewer teams than participated in the 1989 championship.

The Leinster championship was reduced to five teams as Westmeath decided to opt out and field a team in the All-Ireland Senior B Hurling Championship.

The Ulster championship was reduced to just two teams as Derry also decided to field a team in the lower championship.

Team summaries

Results

Leinster Senior Hurling Championship

Munster Senior Hurling Championship

Ulster Senior Hurling Championship

All-Ireland Senior Hurling Championship

Championship statistics

Scoring
First goal of the championship: Shane Fitzgibbon for Limerick against Clare (Munster quarter-final, 13 May 1990)
Widest winning margin: 16 points
Cork 4-15 : 1-8 Waterford (Munster semi-final, 3 June 1990)
Offaly 4-15 : 1-8 Kilkenny (Leinster semi-final, 17 June 1990)
Most goals in a match: 7
Wexford 2-23 : 5-4 Laois (Leinster quarter -final, 27 May 1990)
Cork 5-15 : 2-21 Galway (All-Ireland final, 2 September 1990)
Most points in a match: 37
Tipperary 2-20 : 1-17 Limerick (Munster semi-final, 10 June 1990)
Most goals by one team in a match: 5
Laois 5-4 : 2-23 Wexford (Leinster quarter -final, 27 May 1990)
Cork 5-15 : 2-21 Galway (All-Ireland final, 2 September 1990)
Most goals scored by a losing team: 5
Laois 5-4 : 2-23 Wexford (Leinster quarter -final, 27 May 1990)
Most points scored by a losing team: 21
Galway 2-21 : 5-15 Cork (All-Ireland final, 2 September 1990)

Miscellaneous

Cork became All Ireland champions in a double were the first county since Tipperary in 1900 to be both All Ireland Champions in football and hurling 100 years after their first one also Tipperary in 1895, 1900, Cork in 1890 and 1990 were All Ireland football and hurling champions in the same season.

Top scorers

Season

Single game

Broadcasting

The following matches were broadcast live on television in Ireland on RTÉ. In the United Kingdom Channel 4 broadcast live coverage of the All-Ireland final. Highlights of a number of other games were shown on The Sunday Game.

Sources
 Corry, Eoghan, The GAA Book of Lists (Hodder Headline Ireland, 2005).
 Donegan, Des, The Complete Handbook of Gaelic Games (DBA Publications Limited, 2005).
 Nolan, Pat, Flashbacks: A Half Century of Cork Hurling (The Collins Press, 2000).
 Sweeney, Éamonn, Munster Hurling Legends (The O'Brien Press, 2002).

References

1990